The Union of the Sun and Moon is one of the seventeen tantras of the esoteric instruction cycle which are a suite of tantras known variously as: Nyingtik, Upadesha or Menngagde within Dzogchen discourse.

English discourse
Namkha'i and Shane (1986, 1999: p. 91) open the discourse of the 'Song of the Vajra' (Wylie: rdo rje'i glu zhig) an excerpt of the Union of the Sun and Moon into the English language and render it thus:

Citations

Primary resources
Nyi ma dang zla ba kha sbyor ba chen po gsang ba'i rgyud (@ Wikisource in Wylie)
ཉི་མ་དང་ཟླ་བ་ཁ་སྦྱོར་བ་ཆེན་པོ་གསང་བའི་རྒྱུད @ Wikisource (Tibetan Unicode)
nyi zla kha sbyor @ TBRC as PDFs of Pecha

External links
 Rachel Pang (n.d.). 'Text Analysis of the Union of Sun and Moon Tantra (nyid zla kha sbyor rgyud)' from the Tibetan Renaissance Seminar
 Namkhai Norbu & John Shane (translators) (n.d.). The Union of the Solar and Lunar Tantra (an excerpt)
 Tantra on the Secret Union of Sun and Moon

Dzogchen texts
Nyingma tantras